Purau is a small town in Canterbury, New Zealand, facing Lyttelton Harbour.

Geography 
Purau is located on Banks Peninsula, one of the southern bays forming Lyttelton Harbour.

History
Purau has a long history of Māori settlement. Ngāti Māmoe lived here prior to Ngāi Tahu settling the bay. There are many Māori burial sites in the area.

European occupation started in 1843, when the Greenwood brothers started a farm here. They sold to the Rhodes brothers in 1847 (William Barnard and George, with the latter taking over management of the station). When Robert Heaton Rhodes, another of the Rhodes brothers, came to New Zealand in 1850, he took over Purau.

Demographics
It is part of the Eastern Bays-Banks Peninsula SA2 statistical area.

Purau had a population of 69 at the 2018 New Zealand census, an increase of 18 people (35.3%) since the 2013 census, and an increase of 6 people (9.5%) since the 2006 census. There were 33 households. There were 33 males and 33 females, giving a sex ratio of 1.0 males per female. The median age was 52.5 years (compared with 37.4 years nationally), with 9 people (13.0%) aged under 15 years, 6 (8.7%) aged 15 to 29, 39 (56.5%) aged 30 to 64, and 15 (21.7%) aged 65 or older.

Ethnicities were 95.7% European/Pākehā, 13.0% Māori, and 4.3% Pacific peoples (totals add to more than 100% since people could identify with multiple ethnicities).

Although some people objected to giving their religion, 47.8% had no religion, 26.1% were Christian and 4.3% had other religions.

Of those at least 15 years old, 18 (30.0%) people had a bachelor or higher degree, and 6 (10.0%) people had no formal qualifications. The median income was $32,500, compared with $31,800 nationally. The employment status of those at least 15 was that 27 (45.0%) people were employed full-time, 12 (20.0%) were part-time, and 3 (5.0%) were unemployed.

Gallery

References

Banks Peninsula
Populated places in Canterbury, New Zealand